Blastodiniales is an order of dinoflagellates belonging to the class Dinophyceae.

Families:
 Apodiniaceae Chatton 
 Paradiniaceae J.Schiller
Haplozoonidae Chatton

References

Dinophyceae
Dinoflagellate orders